Louis C. Ott (August 1, 1855 – July 28, 1924) was an American politician from New York. He was elected to the New York State Assembly in 1891.

Life 
Ott was born in Brooklyn on August 1, 1855, to German immigrants. He attended local public schools and became a cigar manufacturer.

In 1885, he was appointed Deputy Internal Revenue Collector. He served this position until his appointment as Kings County Deputy Sheriff in 1890.

In 1891, Ott was elected to the New York State Assembly, representing the Kings County 7th District. He served in the Assembly in 1892 and 1893.

After he left the Assembly, Ott moved to Rockaway Beach, Queens, where he worked as a brewery agent and managed several hotels. He was elected to the Queens County Board of Supervisor, representing the Rockaways and Inwood, prior to the consolidation of New York City.

His wife's name was Louisa (1858-1917), and his children were Louis C., Jr., William, Andrew, Harry, Walter, Robert, Mrs. F. Reihl, and Mrs. Ernest H. Mejo.

Ott died on July 28, 1924, in his daughter's Lynbrook home. He was buried in the Lutheran All Faiths Cemetery.

References

External links 

 Political Graveyard

1855 births
1924 deaths
Democratic Party members of the New York State Assembly
Politicians from Brooklyn
American people of German descent
Public officeholders of Rockaway, Queens
19th-century American politicians
Burials in New York (state)
Town supervisors in New York (state)